The Dhaka Stock Exchange (DSE) ( Dhaka stôk ekschenj), located in Nikunja, Dhaka, is one of the two stock exchanges of Bangladesh, the other being the Chittagong Stock Exchange. In 2021, the combined market capitalisation of listed companies on the Dhaka bourse stood at over $68 billion. In January 2023, DSE and Nasdaq announced their partnership with trading technology.

History
First incorporated as East Pakistan Stock Exchange Association Ltd on 28 April 1954 and started formal trading in 1956. It was renamed as East Pakistan Stock Exchange Ltd on 23 June 1962. Again renamed as Dacca Stock Exchange Ltd on 13 May 1964. After the liberation war in 1971 the trading was discontinued for five years. In 1976 trading restarted in Bangladesh, on 16 September 1986 DSE was started. The formula for calculating DSE all share price index was changed according to IFC on 1 November 1993. The automated trading was initiated on 10 August 1998 and started on 1 January 2001. A central securities depository system was initiated on 24 January 2004.

As of 16 November 2009, the benchmark index of the Dhaka Stock Exchange (DSE) crossed 4000 points for the first time, setting another new high at 4148 points. In 2010, the index crossed 8500 points and finally crashed in the first quarter of 2011. Millions of investors lost their money and came out onto the street blaming the speculators and regulators for the bubble that finally burst in what became known as the 2011 Bangladesh share market scam. Currently, there are total 22 industrial sectors in DSE which accommodate 625 listed companies.

Formation
Dhaka Stock Exchange (DSE) is a public limited company. It is formed and managed under Company Act 1994, Security and Exchange Commission Act 1993, Security and Exchange Commission Regulation 1994, and Security Exchange (Inside Trading) regulation 1994. The issued capital of this company is Tk. 500,000, which is divided up to 250 shares each pricing Tk. 2000. No individual or firm can buy more than one share. According to the stock market rule, only members can participate on the floor and buy shares for themselves or their clients. At present, it has 238 members. The market capitalization of the Dhaka Stock Exchange reached nearly $9  billion in September 2007 and $27.4  billion on 9 December 2009.

Management
The management and operation of Dhaka Stock Exchange is entrusted on a 25 members board of directors. Among them 12 are elected from DSE members, another 12 are selected from different trade bodies and relevant organisations. The CEO is the 25th ex officio member of the board. The government has appointed Professor Shibli Rubayat Ul Islam, who teaches banking and insurance at Dhaka University, as the chairman of Bangladesh Securities and Exchange Commission, reports bdnews24.com.

The following organisations are currently holding positions in DSE Board:
 Bangladesh Bank
 ICB – Investment Corporation of Bangladesh
 President of Institute of Chartered Accountants of Bangladesh
 President of Federation of Bangladesh Chambers of Commerce and Industries
 President of Metropolitan Chambers of Commerce and Industries
 Professor of Finance Department of Dhaka University
 President of Dhaka Chamber of Commerce & Industry.

Trading

The Dhaka Stock Exchange is open for trading Sunday through Thursday between 10:00am – 2:30pm BST, with the exception of holidays declared by the Exchange in advance.
In the month of Ramadan, the exchange is open for trading between 10:00am – 2:00pm BST.

There are a total of 625 Companies Listed on this Stock exchange. The listing provides an exclusive privilege to securities in the stock exchange. Only listed shares are quoted on the stock exchange. A stock exchange facilitates transparency in transactions of listed securities in perfect equality and competitive conditions. Listing is beneficial to the company, to the investor, and to the public at large.

The trading indices are DSE Broad Index (DSEX), DSEX Shariah Index (DSES), DSE 30 Index (DS30), CDSET.

2010–11 crash

The bullish market turned bearish during November 2010, with the exchange losing 1,800 points between December 2010 and January 2011. Millions of investors have been rendered bankrupt as a result of the market crash. The crash is believed to be caused artificially to benefit a handful of players at the expense of the big players.

List of chairpersons

See also
 Economy of Bangladesh
 List of South Asian stock exchanges
 List of Companies in Dhaka Stock Exchange

References

Further reading

External links
 
 

Economy of Dhaka
Stock exchanges in Bangladesh
Former stock exchanges in Pakistan
1954 establishments in East Pakistan
Financial services companies established in 1954